Retrospective is a best-of compilation album released in the US of Leaether Strip.

Track listing
 Japanese Bodies
 Zyclon B
 Anti US (Psycho Strip Edit)
 How Do I Know
 Strap Me Down
 Razor Blades (Go Berzerk)
 Don't Tame Your Soul
 No Rest for the Wicked
 Adrenalin Rush
 Nosecandy
 Turn to Stone
 Face of Evil
 Take the Fear Away
 Lies to Tell (Lights of Euphoria Remix)

Leæther Strip compilation albums
2007 compilation albums
Zoth Ommog Records compilation albums